Costaconvexa is a genus of moths in the family Geometridae first described by Ramón Agenjo Cecilia in 1949.

Species
 Costaconvexa caespitaria (Christoph, 1881)
 Costaconvexa centrostrigaria (Wollaston, 1858) – bent-line carpet
 Costaconvexa polygrammata (Borkhausen, 1794) – many-lined moth

References

External links
 
 

Xanthorhoini